Industrial and Commercial Development Corporation (ICDC) is a Kenyan government-owned development finance institution.

ICDC is a government parastatal, whose primary objective is to facilitate the investment by Kenyans in the economy of the country, while simultaneously providing financing to Kenyan businesses and manufacturers, thus growing the local economy. , the company's total assets were valued at approximately KSh.11.9 billion/= (US$138 million).

History
The company began its operations in 1954 as a 100% wholly owned entity of the Government of Kenya. In 1967, to allow  the public to participate in the economy of newly independent Kenya, ICDC spun off an investment subsidiary which it called ICDC Investment Company Limited. In 2007, that subsidiary rebranded as Centum Investment Company Limited. Following gradual, progressive divestments by the Kenyan government, ICDC shareholding in Centum was down to just under 23%, as of March 2013.

Investment structure
ICDC is organized into three main operational divisions namely:

 Equity Investments: - Invests in profitable, well run Kenyan businesses, which may or may not be publicly traded. Assumes equity ownership positions in the businesses.
 Loans: - Makes business loans to qualifying Kenyan companies without assuming equity positions in the borrowing entities.
 Asset Management and Advisory Services: - Serves as Asset Manager and Financial Adviser to qualifying Kenyan businesses.

Investee companies
The following are some of the companies where ICDC has invested:
 AON Minet Insurance Brokers Limited - Risk Management, Insurance
 Centum Investment Company Limited - Investments, Real Estate - 23% shareholding
 KENATCO Taxis Limited - Taxis for hire - 100% shareholding
 Development Bank of Kenya - A development bank, which also offers commercial banking services - 89% shareholding
 Eveready East Africa Limited - Batteries, Skin shavers
 Uchumi Supermarkets Limited - Supermarkets - 3% shareholding
 Funguo Investments Limited - Investments - 100% shareholding
 General Motors East Africa Limited - Automobiles, Trucks, Automotive  products
 IDB Capital Limited - Development Finance for Small & Medium Enterprises (SMEs)
 Kenya National Trading Corporation Limited - Promotion of trade amongst Kenyan SMEs
 Kenya Wine Agencies Limited (KWAL) - Procurement, production, packaging and marketing of wine and other beverages
 Kisii Bottlers Limited - Coca-Cola franchise bottler
 Mt. Kenya Bottlers Limited - Coca-Cola franchise bottler
 Rift Valley Bottlers Limited - Coca-Cola franchise bottler
 South Nyanza Sugar Company Limited - Sugar manufacturing
  Agro-Chemical and Food Company Limited (ACFC) - Production of alcohol, spirits and yeast

Governance
Francis Kimemia, one of the non-Executive Directors, serves as the Chairman of the ten-person Board of Directors. The Ag. Executive Director and Ag. Chief Executive Officer, is Kennedy Wanderi.

See also
 Centum Investment Company Limited
 Economy of Kenya
 Development Bank of Kenya
 Uchumi
 Nairobi

References

Government-owned companies of Kenya
1954 establishments in Kenya
Financial services companies established in 1954
Companies based in Nairobi
Financial services companies of Kenya